Ana Joaquina dos Santos e Silva (1788–1859), was a Euro-African Nhara slave trader, money lender, and planter in Angola.  She was the perhaps biggest slave trader in Angola, which traded with Brazil during the 1830s, and financed the expedition of Joaquim Rodrigues Graça.

Biography
Ana Joaquina dos Santos e Silva was a member of the privileged Afro-Portuguese class who had a leading position within the business community of Portuguese Luanda, where white Europeans consisted of a mere thousand people at the time. 

She was one of the leading slave traders of the booming slave trade between Angola and the Empire of Brazil in the 1830s- and 40s. The slave trade was formally banned in 1836, but continued in practice in Angola, where the economy was dominated by it. 

Ana dos Santos e Silva owned several plantations for sugar and coffee, and a three stories palace residence in Luanda, which later became a museum. 

When Brazil banned slave trade in 1850 and the trade discontinued in practice, she had established herself as a successful banker, investor and financier of merchants, authorities and transport business.

References

1788 births
1859 deaths
19th-century businesswomen
African slave traders
19th-century African businesspeople
Plantation owners
19th-century women landowners
African slave owners
Women slave owners